Episema is a genus of moths of the family Noctuidae. The genus was described by Ochsenheimer in 1816.

Species
Episema amasina (Hampson, 1906) Turkey
Episema brandbergensis Hacker, 2004 Namibia
Episema didymogramma (Boursin, 1955) Turkey
Episema glaucina (Esper, 1789) northern Africa, central and southern Europe, Turkmenistan, Sudan
Episema gozmanyi Ronkay & Hacker, 1985 Crete
Episema grueneri Boisduval, [1837] south-western Europe
Episema haemapasta (Hampson, 1914) Libya
Episema korsakovi (Christoph, 1885) south-eastern Europe, Caucaus, Transcaucasus
Episema kourion Nilsson, Svendsen & Fibiger, 1999 Cyprus
Episema lederi Christoph, 1885 south-eastern Europe, Turkey, Transcaucasus
Episema lemoniopsis Hacker, 2001
Episema minuta Boursin & Ebert, 1976 Afghanistan
Episema minutoides Ronkay, Varga & Hreblay, 1998 Turkmenistan (Kopet Dagh)
Episema scillae (Chrétien, 1888) Algeria
Episema tersa (Denis & Schiffermüller, 1775) south-eastern Europe, Sicily, Tunisia, Ukraine

References

Cuculliinae
Taxa named by Ferdinand Ochsenheimer